The 1971 NCAA College Division football season was the 16th season of college football in the United States organized by the National Collegiate Athletic Association at the NCAA College Division level.

Conference standings

Rankings

College Division teams (also referred to as "small college") were ranked in polls by the AP (a panel of writers) and by UPI (coaches). The national champion(s) for each season were determined by the final poll rankings, published at or near the end of the regular season, before any bowl games were played.

College Division final polls
Delaware, who during the regular season had defeated Rutgers, Villanova, and Boston University, averaged 40 points per game, and had a 9–1 record, was ranked first by both UPI and AP; both polls also ranked McNeese State (9–0–1) second, and Eastern Michigan (7–0–2) third.

United Press International (coaches) final poll
Published on November 24

Associated Press (writers) final poll
Published on November 24

Bowl games
The postseason consisted of four bowl games as regional finals, all played on December 11. This was the first year for the Pioneer Bowl; it succeeded the Pecan Bowl, which had been played in Arlington, Texas.

Top-ranked Delaware met  in the Boardwalk Bowl; played indoors at Convention Hall, Delaware won by 50 points in a rout. The next two teams in the polls both lost; Eastern Michigan was defeated by Louisiana Tech in the Pioneer Bowl, and McNeese State fell to Tennessee State—led by future National Football League quarterback Joe Gilliam—in the Grantland Rice Bowl. Out west in the Camellia Bowl, Boise State mounted a 25–0 fourth quarter comeback to defeat Chico State.

See also
 1971 NCAA University Division football season
 1971 NAIA Division I football season
 1971 NAIA Division II football season

References